Rēzekne Castle ruins are located in the downtown of Rēzekne, Latvia, a city in the center of Latgale. The castle served as a base of the local Livonian order landlords until the 16th century and also as the main military support base for battles against Russians and Lithuanians. Today, fragments of the stone walls and the foundation can be seen on the ancient castle hill.

History

Archeological excavations reveal that between the 9th and 12th centuries a Latgalian wooden fortress was situated in the place where the castle ruins now stand. It is unknown when the Latgalian fortress was destroyed, however in 1285, the master of the Livonian Order Vilhelms Šurborgs built a stone fortress on the Rositten stone hill. The fortress consisted of a two-story brick and stone castle with a three-storey towers and thick brick walls, functioning as the administrative seat of Rezekne. 

The castle was ravaged and rebuilt many times. Between 1577 and 1579, it was occupied by Czar Ivan IV Vasilyevich, and after the war it became part of the Duchy of Livonia. During the Polish-Swedish War in 1601, and again from 1625 to 1626, the Rezekne castle was occupied by the Swedish army, during the Second Northern War. The battle took place in 1656, during which the Rezekne castle was finally destroyed as the Swedish troops managed to defeat the much larger Russian forces. In 1660 it was reinstated in the Inflantia, but the castle had lost its former military importance. From 1712 it was left in ruins.

See also
List of castles in Latvia

References

Attribution
This article is based on the translation of the corresponding article of the Latvian Wikipedia. A list of contributors can be found there at the History section.

External links

Buildings and structures in Rēzekne
Castles in Latvia
Castles of the Livonian Order